In the Middle Ages, criticism of crusading was a minority opinion in western Europe. By contrast, the crusades in general were roundly criticized in the Byzantine Empire and unanimously condemned in the Islamic world.

Criticism of crusading could be limited to a particular crusade or apply to crusades in general. The dominant strand of criticism was aimed at the conduct of crusades and not at the theory of crusading itself. Although the latter criticism did exist, it was expressed only by a small minority within the minority of crusade critics. More often, criticism was aimed at improving the odds of success of future crusades. As crusaders were held to a higher standard than soldiers in other wars, their defeats were often blamed on their sins, such as greed and sexual promiscuity.

The financing and preaching of crusades also came under criticism. In Roger of Wendover and Matthew of Paris, for example, new taxes were criticized as dangerous precedents, while preachers were accused of extorting funds.

Although criticism was present from the beginning, in general it increased across the main era of the crusades (1095–1291). Disillusionment often preceded critique. The earliest criticism of crusading itself, and not merely the means and effects of crusading, is associated with the failure of the Second Crusade (1147–1149). Gerhoh of Reichersberg initially supported the First Crusade (1095–1099) and the Second, but by 1162 his attitude had shifted. He had concluded that the motivation for the crusade was avarice and that God had willed the crusaders to be deceived by false preaching and led to destruction. The Annals of Würzburg go so far as to claim that the Second Crusade was inspired by the devil:

Around the same time, Isaac de l'Étoile criticized the Knights Templar as a "new monstrosity" and wondered at how plunder and massacre could be committed in the name of Jesus. In 1214, Adam of Perseigne, who fought in the Holy Land on the Fourth Crusade (1202–1204) wrote against the very idea:

The failure of the Seventh Crusade (1248–1250) sparked a new wave of criticism. Humbert of Romans, in his treatise on crusade preaching, De praedicatione crucis, refers to contemporary criticism of crusading.

Notes

Bibliography

Crusades
Crusades